Douglas Adams's Guide to The Hitch-Hiker's Guide to the Galaxy is a BBC Radio production sold as an audio book on two cassette tapes (later, two CDs). The programme was partially broadcast by BBC Radio 4 as a 40-minute feature titled The Guide to 20 Years' Hitch-Hiking on 5 March 1998, marking the 20th anniversary of the first radio programme in the Hitchhiker's Guide to the Galaxy series.

Tape one 
The first tape runs 55 minutes and is narrated by Peter Jones, who narrated the original radio series. It features comments by many of the people involved, telling how the series was created and how it developed. The participants are Douglas Adams, Simon Brett (producer of the very first programme), Simon Jones (Arthur Dent), Geoffrey McGivern (Ford Prefect), Paddy Kingsland (sound effects and audio mixing), Stephen Moore (Marvin), Geoffrey Perkins (producer of the first two radio series, except for the very first programme) and Nick Webb (Pan Books).

These people tell their first-hand account of how it all started, and how surprised they all were at the huge success they had created. They also tell the exciting story of how the last programme in the second series was so plagued by deadline problems that it almost didn't get broadcast, and the mind-boggling conditions they worked under to complete the job in time.

These comments are intermixed with some clips from the radio programmes, including some highlights such as the destruction of the earth and Marvin telling everyone how depressed he is.

The programme was written by Debbie Barham.

Tape two 
The second tape runs 50 minutes and consists of Douglas Adams being interviewed by Iain Johnstone. Many topics are touched upon, often with surprising connections between them.

Some of the topics discussed by Douglas Adams are: University of Cambridge and Footlights, Monty Python, Graham Chapman, Star Wars, Tolstoy's Resurrection, Last Chance to See, the Nordic god Thor, is Arthur Dent really Douglas Adams, Simon Jones, light switches, Richard Dawkins, atheism, Procol Harum, Doom Watch, X-Files, Sherlock Holmes, Arthur C. Clarke, The Digital Village, John Cleese's influence in selecting "42", the Hubble Constant, and his daughter Polly.

Availability 
The product is no longer available at BBC Shop, but can usually be found on Internet auction sites and used book sites and Internet book stores that sell used books via "partners".
It is available as a bonus on the CD boxset of the first two series: Hitchhiker's Guide To The Galaxy: Collector's Edition .

References

Books by Douglas Adams
The Hitchhiker's Guide to the Galaxy
1998 books